Alan Barblett (17 November 1929 – 18 November 2012) was an Australian field hockey player, lawyer and philanthropist. As a sportsman, Barblett competed in the men's field hockey tournament at the 1956 Summer Olympics.

Barblett graduated from the University of Western Australia with a law degree and arts degree majoring in philosophy and psychology. He joined the council of Western Australian Institute of Technology (WAIT, now Curtin University) in 1970.

Barblett Oval on the Bentley campus of the university is named in his honour.

References

External links
 

1929 births
2012 deaths
Australian male field hockey players
Olympic field hockey players of Australia
Field hockey players at the 1956 Summer Olympics
Field hockey players from Perth, Western Australia